Castor Airport  is located  west of Castor, Alberta, Canada.

References

External links
Page about this airport on COPA's Places to Fly airport directory

Registered aerodromes in Alberta
County of Paintearth No. 18